Jango is a British police comedy series produced in 1961 by Associated Rediffusion for ITV. It starred Robert Urquhart in the lead role of Jango Smith, with Moira Redmond as Dee Smith, his wife. The show also featured performances by Peter Sallis and Brian Wilde.

Plot

Episode status
Only eight episodes were produced and all were believed lost, until the mid-1990s when a kinescope of one episode was discovered.

External links
 

1961 British television series debuts
1961 British television series endings
1960s British sitcoms
1960s British police comedy television series
ITV sitcoms
English-language television shows
Black-and-white British television shows